The Sweden national youth handball team is the national under–18 handball team of Sweden. Controlled by the Swedish Handball Federation it represents Sweden in international matches.

History

World Championship record

European Championship record

References

External links
Official website 
Sweden (18 Team) at eurohandball.com

 

Handball in Sweden
Men's national youth handball teams
Handball
Youth sport in Sweden